Rodrigo Santos Varanda (born 11 January 2003), known as Rodrigo Varanda, is a Brazilian professional footballer who plays as a forward for América Mineiro, on loan from Corinthians.

Club career 
Varanda started his career when he was six years old at Corinthians' youth squad, playing futsal before changing full time to the football team.

He made his professional debut for the club in a 2021 Campeonato Paulista away match against Red Bull Bragantino on 28 February 2021. He scored his first goal for the club in the next game as an equalizer against Corinthians' biggest rival Palmeiras at Neo Química Arenaon 3 March.

References

External links 

2003 births
Living people
People from Guarulhos
Brazilian footballers
Association football forwards
Sport Club Corinthians Paulista players
São Bernardo Futebol Clube players
Footballers from São Paulo (state)